The EuroBasket 2022 was the 41st edition of the EuroBasket championship organized by FIBA Europe. It was the first since it was agreed it would take place every four years, with a similar system of qualification as for the FIBA Basketball World Cup. It was originally scheduled to take place between 2 and 19 September 2021, but due to the COVID-19 pandemic and the subsequent postponement of the 2020 Summer Olympics to 2021, it was postponed to September 2022.

Like the previous two editions, the tournament was co-hosted by four countries. Games in the group stage were held in the Czech Republic, Georgia, Germany, and Italy. The knock-out phase was played in Berlin, Germany.

The tournament featured three All-NBA First Team members, Nikola Jokić (Serbia), Giannis Antetokounmpo (Greece) and Luka Dončić (Slovenia), making it one of the most anticipated tournaments in EuroBasket history.

Spain won the final against France, achieving its fourth EuroBasket title in the last six tournaments. Germany secured the bronze medal on home soil after defeating Poland.

Host selection

For EuroBasket 2015 and 2017, FIBA Europe opened three bidding options for hosting: to host a preliminary group, to host the final round, or to host the entire tournament. In the end, each of these two tournaments was hosted in four cities in four countries. It was hosted by four nations for the third time.

Seven countries submitted separate candidacies to host Eurobasket 2022:

  (Prague)
  (Tallinn)
  (Tbilisi)
  (Cologne, group stage, and Berlin, final)
  (Budapest)
  (Milan)
  (Ljubljana)

Czech Republic, Georgia, Germany and Italy were selected as host countries on 15 July 2019 at the Central Board in Munich, Germany.

Venues

Qualification

The qualification started in November 2017, with nine teams participating in the pre-qualifiers, including the five eliminated teams from the 2019 World Cup European Pre-Qualifiers. The co-hosts (Czech Republic, Georgia, Germany and Italy) participated in qualifiers, despite having already qualified to the EuroBasket 2022. After the 2022 Russian invasion of Ukraine, Russia was expelled from the tournament and replaced by Montenegro.

Qualified teams

Marketing

Logo
The official logo was unveiled on 16 December 2019.

Draw
The draw took place on 29 April 2021 in Berlin, Germany.

Each of the four hosts was granted the right to select a partner federation for commercial and marketing criteria. These teams would automatically be placed into the same group as their chosen partner country.

Seedings
The 24 qualified teams were seeded according to the FIBA Men's World Ranking.

Russia was replaced by Montenegro.

Referees
The following 44 referees were selected for the tournament.

  Geert Jacobs
  Ademir Zurapović
  Martin Horozov
  Ventsislav Velikov
  Martin Vulić
  Ilias Kounelles
  Ivor Matějek
  Mihkel Männiste
  Alexandre Deman
  Nicolas Maestre
  Yohan Rosso
  Carsten Straube
  Georgios Poursanidis
  Péter Praksch
  Erez Gurion
  Beniamino Attard
  Lorenzo Baldini
  Saverio Lanzarini
  Manuel Mazzoni (suspended after Lithuania-Germany match)
  Andris Aunkrogers
  Mārtiņš Kozlovskis
  Oskars Lucis
  Gatis Saliņš
  Gvidas Gedvilas
  Gintaras Mačiulis
  Zdravko Rutešić
  Radomir Vojinović
  Igor Mitrovski
  Wojciech Liszka (suspended after Lithuania-Germany match)
  Michał Proc (suspended after Lithuania-Germany match)
  Dariusz Zapolski
  Paulo Marques
  Marius Ciulin
  Gizella Gyorgyi
  Aleksandar Glišić
  Zdenko Tomašovič
  Boris Krejić
  Fernando Calatrava
  Luis Castillo
  Antonio Conde
  Kerem Baki
  Yener Yılmaz
  Zafer Yılmaz
  Serhiy Zashchuk

Squads

Preliminary round

Group A

Group B

Group C

Group D

Knockout stage

All games are played at the Mercedes-Benz Arena in Berlin, Germany.

Bracket

Final

Final standings

Statistics and awards

Statistical leaders

Players

Points

Rebounds

Assists

Blocks

Steals

Efficiency

Teams

Points

Rebounds

Assists

Blocks

Steals

Efficiency

Awards
The awards were announced on 19 September 2022.

Turkey–Georgia brawl
During the game between Turkey and Georgia in Group A, Furkan Korkmaz and Duda Sanadze were ejected after a scuffle. Korkmaz was reportedly attacked when leaving the arena by Georgian players. The following day, the Turkish federation threatened to leave the tournament. After the game, the Turkish federation also submitted a complaint because the game clock ran for 22 seconds while the game was paused; this complaint was initially dismissed by FIBA.

On 5 September, FIBA opened an investigation and ten days later, on 15 September, announced to have opened "disciplinary proceedings for engaging in unsportsmanlike conduct" against four players.

References

External links

 

 

2022
2022–23 in European basketball
2020s in Berlin
2020s in Cologne
2020s in Prague
2020s in Tbilisi
2020s in Milan
September 2022 sports events in Europe
Sports competitions in Berlin
Sports competitions in Cologne
Sports competitions in Prague
Sports competitions in Tbilisi
Sports competitions in Milan
Basketball events postponed due to the COVID-19 pandemic
Sports events affected by the 2022 Russian invasion of Ukraine
International basketball competitions hosted by Germany
International basketball competitions hosted by the Czech Republic
International basketball competitions hosted by Georgia (country)
International basketball competitions hosted by Italy